The Albuquerque mayoral election of 2009 occurred on October 6, 2009.

In July 2009, incumbent Mayor Martin Chavez announced that he would seek a fourth term.

Former State Senator Richard Romero (D)  also ran.

State Representative Richard J. Berry won the election with 36,466 votes (43.82%) to Chavez's 29,140 votes (35.02%) and Romero's 17,458 (20.98%) Write-in candidates won 149 votes, or .18% of the total. Although Berry received less than 50 percent of the vote, Albuquerque election law requires a runoff only if no candidate receives at least 40 percent of the vote.

Candidates
Richard J. Berry (Republican), State Representative
Martin Chavez (Democratic), incumbent mayor
Richard Romero, Democratic), former State Senator

References

Albuquerque
2009 New Mexico elections
Local elections in New Mexico
2009